Anatoli Georgievich Vitushkin (June 25, 1931 – May 9, 2004) was a Soviet mathematician noted for his work on analytic capacity and other parts of mathematical analysis.

Early life
Anatoli Georgievich Vitushkin was born on 25 June 1931 in Moscow.  He was blind.

Career
He entered Moscow State University in 1949 after graduating from the Tula Suvorov Military School where mathematics was taught as part of a broader education for potential officers.  He graduated in 1954. He studied under Andrey Kolmogorov and benefited from participation in Alexander Kronrod's circle.

He joined the Steklov Institute of Mathematics staff in 1965.

For many years he was a member of the Editorial board of the Russian journal; Mathematical Notes.

He died, at the age of 72, in Moscow on 9 May 2004.

Bibliography

References

External links

20th-century Russian mathematicians
1931 births
2004 deaths
Moscow State University alumni
Russian information theorists
Full Members of the Russian Academy of Sciences
Soviet mathematicians
Blind academics
Burials in Troyekurovskoye Cemetery